Mattie V. Lee Home is a historic home located at Charleston, West Virginia.  It stands on what was once a densely packed commercial block close to the center of a historically African-American neighborhood in Charleston.  It was built about 1920 and is a two-story concrete block structure with a prominent raised basement and features a two-tier front porch.

It was listed on the National Register of Historic Places in 1992.

References

African-American history of West Virginia
Houses in Charleston, West Virginia
Neoclassical architecture in West Virginia
Houses completed in 1920
Houses on the National Register of Historic Places in West Virginia
National Register of Historic Places in Charleston, West Virginia